Powellton is an unincorporated community in Sonora Township, Hancock County, Illinois, United States.

References

Unincorporated communities in Hancock County, Illinois
Unincorporated communities in Illinois